Brian Devitt (born 5 April 1948) is a former Australian rules footballer who played with North Melbourne in the Victorian Football League (VFL).

Notes

External links 

Living people
1948 births
Australian rules footballers from Western Australia
North Melbourne Football Club players